Jonahs Run is a stream in the U.S. state of Ohio. It is a tributary to Caesar Creek.

Jonahs Run was named after an early settler.  Variant names were "Jonah's Run" and "Jonas Run".

References

Rivers of Clinton County, Ohio
Rivers of Warren County, Ohio
Rivers of Ohio